Scaptesyle mirabilis is a moth in the subfamily Arctiinae first described by George Hampson in 1900. It is found on Borneo.

References

Lithosiini